Great Britain, the team of the British Olympic Association (BOA), competed at the 2004 Summer Olympics in Athens, Greece, from 13 to 29 August 2004 with the team of selected athletes was officially known as Team GB. The British sent a wide-ranging delegation to the Games, continuing its ubiquitous presence in the Olympic games, the only country to have sent competitors to every summer and winter games since the birth of the modern Olympics in 1896. Great Britain's 264 athletes, 161 men and 103 women, competed in 22 disciplines throughout the two-week event. The team entered the opening ceremony behind the Union Flag carried by judoka Kate Howey. Double gold medal winner Kelly Holmes carried the flag at the closing ceremony.

Chronology
The delegation started the Olympics slowly, the silver its divers won on 14 August being the first of only a few opening-week medals. Although a sprinkling of silver and bronze medals – including a pair in men's and women's k1 kayak slalom – enlivened the mid-week, Britain's first gold did not come until Friday the 20th (won by Chris Hoy in the 1 km track cycling time-trial).

Then, on 21 August ("Golden Saturday") Britain's contributions to the medal table became more significant. First Britain's traditional strength in rowing continued as the men's coxless four, stroked by Matthew Pinsent, narrowly won gold, a defining moment since this was Pinsent's fourth gold medal in as many games. Sailor Ben Ainslie wrapped up a successful few days of racing with a gold, as did the women's Yngling sailboats who were finally awarded the gold medal they had sewn up on Thursday. Bradley Wiggins continued Britain's cycling success, winning gold in the 4 km pursuit. Young swimmer David Davies, coming third in the men's 1500 m freestyle, set a European record in the process and won Britain's second swimming medal of the games – a notable improvement over the 2000 Sydney games from which the swimmers had returned empty-handed. Also on Saturday, it was announced that, after an appeal, Leslie Law would be promoted from silver to gold in the three-day equestrian eventing (and his team from bronze to silver). As the games' aquatic-dominated first week shifted into a second week focused more on track and field events, Kelly Sotherton came third in the heptathlon.

Sunday 22 August brought another rowing medal. However, marathon favourite Paula Radcliffe failed to cope with the heat of Athens and did not finish. The timing of the race with a late afternoon start, supposedly to appease US broadcasters, produced some controversy since summer marathons normally start early in the morning to avoid the heat.

23 August saw Britain's first gold medal of the track and field events, Kelly Holmes winning the women's 800 metres. This was Britain's first gold medal on the track since Sally Gunnell won the 400-metre hurdles at the 1992 Barcelona games.

By claiming bronze in the Madison cycling on 25 August, to add to his earlier individual gold and a silver from the team pursuit, Bradley Wiggins became the first Briton for 40 years to claim three medals in one games.

The evening of Saturday 28 August saw Britain's medal hunt centred on the Olympic Stadium. Steve Backley, in his final javelin throw competition, failed to win the gold he had been seeking since 1992, finishing fourth. Kelly Holmes achieved the middle-distance double, taking gold in the 1500 metres. The men's 4×100-metre relay team won a surprising victory, winning gold ahead of the American team. Earlier in the day, Ian Wynne had added to the medal haul, with a bronze medal in the K1 kayak class, competing despite an ankle injury picked up the day before.

The final day of the games, 29 August, saw Amir Khan collect Britain's last medal of the event with a silver in boxing's lightweight division.

Overall performance
In the final medal table, Great Britain finished in 10th place overall. The BBC stated that this was "the best British performance in the modern era", and quantified this with further considerations: "GB won 37 in 1984, but that was a boycott-hit Games missing the Eastern Bloc countries. Take Los Angeles out of the picture, and this was Britain's best haul since 1924."

Medallists

Great Britain finished in tenth position in the final medal rankings, with 9 gold and 30 total medals.

| width="78%" align="left" valign="top" |

| style="text-align:left; width:23%; vertical-align:top;"|

Multiple medallists
The following Team GB competitors won multiple medals at the 2004 Olympic Games. Kelly Holmes became the first British athlete since 1972 and the first British track and field athlete to win two gold medals at the same Summer Olympics.

Archery 

Four British archers (one man and three women) qualified each for the men's and women's individual archery, and a spot for the women's team.

Athletics

British athletes have so far achieved qualifying standards in the following athletics events (up to a maximum of 3 athletes in each event at the 'A' Standard, and 1 at the 'B' Standard).

Men
Track & road events

Field events

Combined events – Decathlon

Women
Track & road events

* Competed only in heats

Field events

Combined events – Heptathlon

Badminton 

Men

Women

Mixed

Boxing 

Great Britain sent only one boxer to Athens, the 17-year-old Amir Khan. Khan tore through his first four fights, including two that the referees had to stop prematurely. His loss in the final to the defending Olympic champion and three-time world champion gave Khan a 4–1 record and a silver medal; many hoped he would compete the 2008 Summer Olympics but in the event he decided to turn professional later in 2004.

Canoeing

Slalom

Sprint

Qualification Legend: Q = Qualify to final; q = Qualify to semifinal

Cycling

Road
Men

Women

Track
Sprint

Pursuit

Time trial

Keirin

Omnium

Mountain biking

Diving 

British divers qualified for eight individual spots at the 2004 Olympic Games. Three British synchronised diving teams qualified through the 2004 FINA Diving World Cup.

Men

Women

Equestrian

Because only three horse and rider pairs from each nation could advance beyond certain rounds in the individual events, five British pairs did not advance despite being placed sufficiently high.  They received rankings below all pairs that did advance.

Dressage

Eventing

"#" indicates that the score of this rider does not count in the team competition, since only the best three results of a team are counted.

Show jumping

Fencing

Two British fencers qualified for the following events:

Men

Women

Field hockey

Men's tournament

Roster

Group play

9th–12th place Semi-final

9th–10th place Final

Gymnastics

Artistic
Women
Team

Individual finals

Rhythmic

Trampoline

Judo

Eight British judoka (two men and six women) qualified for the 2004 Summer Olympics.

Men

Women

Modern pentathlon

Two British athletes qualified to compete in the modern pentathlon event through the European and UIPM World Championships.

Rowing

British rowers qualified the following boats:

Men

Women

Qualification Legend: FA=Final A (medal); FB=Final B (non-medal); FC=Final C (non-medal); FD=Final D (non-medal); FE=Final E (non-medal); FF=Final F (non-medal); SA/B=Semifinals A/B; SC/D=Semifinals C/D; SE/F=Semifinals E/F; R=Repechage

Sailing

British sailors qualified one boat for each of the following events.

Men

Women

Open

M = Medal race; OCS = On course side of the starting line; DSQ = Disqualified; DNF = Did not finish; DNS= Did not start; RDG = Redress given

Shooting 

Six British shooters (five men and one woman) qualified to compete in the following events:

Men

Women

Swimming 

British swimmers earned qualifying standards in the following events (up to a maximum of 2 swimmers in each event at the A-standard time, and 1 at the B-standard time): All British swimmers must qualify by finishing in the top two of the Olympic trials having gained the GB qualifying A standard set by British Swimming in the relevant final (that time being the fastest time of the sixteenth fastest swimmer internationally in that event in 2003).

Men

* Competed only in heats

Women

* Competed only in heats

Taekwondo

Four British taekwondo jin qualified for the following events.

Tennis

Great Britain had only a single tennis player that qualified automatically through their world ranking.

Triathlon

Six British triathletes qualified for the following events.

Weightlifting 

Two British weightlifters qualified for the following events:

Wrestling 

Men's freestyle

Media coverage
The main rights to Olympic coverage in the UK are held by the BBC, under the Ofcom Code on Sports and Other Listed and Designated Events. 2004 marked the first year that digital television and webcasts were used to cover an Olympic Games. The digital television service allowed up to five streamed channels covering the games, allowing more extensive coverage of minor sports, whilst the BBC's website permitted UK broadband users to view live streams from a variety of events, and other countries to view delayed highlights. Live broadcasts were run throughout the day, with a highlights program on BBC1 following the close of the day's events.

The BBC's coverage was anchored (at various times of the day) by Craig Doyle, Clare Balding, Suzi Perry, Sue Barker, Steve Rider, Hazel Irvine and Steve Cram. Expert analysts and commentators included Sharron Davies, Jonathan Edwards, Sally Gunnell, Michael Johnson, Colin Jackson, and Steve Redgrave.

Eurosport also ran coverage of the Games viewable in the UK – in accordance with the ITC Code, it can show live events, provided that such events can also be broadcast by the BBC (although the BBC can choose not to do so).

Radio coverage was provided by BBC Radio Five Live and IRN, and the events were also covered by the sports pages of the major newspapers.

See also
Great Britain at the 2004 Summer Paralympics

References

External links
Official Report of the XXVIII Olympiad
British Olympic Association
Team GB
BBC Olympics News and Coverage

Nations at the 2004 Summer Olympics
2004
Summer Olympics